The 2014 Air Force Falcons football team represented the United States Air Force Academy in the 2014 NCAA Division I FBS football season. The Falcons were led by eighth-year head coach Troy Calhoun and played their home games at Falcon Stadium. They were members of the Mountain West Conference in the Mountain Division. They finished the season 10–3, 5–3 in Mountain West play to finish in fourth place in the Mountain Division. They were invited to the Famous Idaho Potato Bowl where they defeated Western Michigan

Schedule

Schedule Source:

Personnel

Coaching staff

Game summaries

Nicholls State

at Wyoming

at Georgia State

Boise State

Navy

at Utah State

New Mexico

at Army

at UNLV

Nevada

at San Diego State

Colorado State

Western Michigan–Famous Idaho Potato Bowl

References

Air Force
Air Force Falcons football seasons
Famous Idaho Potato Bowl champion seasons
Air Force Falcons football